Antonella Cannarozzi is an Italian costume designer who was nominated for her first Academy Award for I Am Love (2009).

A student of the Brera Academy, she is best known for her collaborations with Saverio Costanzo, Maria Sole Tognazzi and Luca Guadagnino.

Partial filmography 

 To Die for Tano (1997)
 Ecco fatto (1998)
 Life Blood (2000)
 Gasoline (2001)
 Melissa P. (2005)
 Provincia meccanica (2005)
 Fast Souls (2006)
 In memoria di me (2007)
 The Man Who Loves (2008)
 Good Morning Heartache (2008)
 I Am Love (2009)
 The Solitude of Prime Numbers (2010)
 Diarchy (short) (2010)
 Missione di pace (2011)
 Padroni di casa (2012)
 In Treatment (2013, TV series)
 A Five Star Life (2013)
 Hungry Hearts (2014)
 Me, Myself and Her (2015)
 Pericle (2016)
 Daughter of Mine (2018)
 My Brilliant Friend (2018, TV series)

References

External links 

Women costume designers
Italian costume designers
Living people
Year of birth missing (living people)